Polychrysum is a genus of flowering plants in the daisy family.

There is only one known species, Polychrysum tadshikorum, native to Afghanistan.

References

Monotypic Asteraceae genera
Anthemideae
Flora of Afghanistan